"Sideways" is a song by American DJs and producers Illenium and Nurko, and singer/songwriter Valerie Broussard. It was released on May 7, 2021, as the fifth single from Illenium's fourth studio album Fallen Embers.

Background
Before it was released, Illenium previewed the song at Ubbi Dubbi 2021.

Singer and songwriter Valerie Broussard described: “‘Sideways’ was written as an ode to a friend who was struggling with her mental health during COVID-19 pandemic lockdown. Having struggled similarly in my own life, I wanted her to know I would always be there for her, even when it felt like the world was falling apart.”

Track listing

Charts

Weekly charts

Year-end charts

References

2021 singles
2021 songs
Illenium songs
Songs written by Illenium